John Dahlin (11 January 1886 – 12 July 1927) was a Swedish track and field athlete who competed in the 1912 Summer Olympics.

In 1912 he qualified for the semi-finals of the 400 metres competition but he did not start in the race. He was also a member of the Swedish relay team which was eliminated in the first round of the 4x400 metre relay event.

References

External links
Profile

1886 births
1927 deaths
Swedish male sprinters
Olympic athletes of Sweden
Athletes (track and field) at the 1912 Summer Olympics